Patrice Verchère (born December 29, 1973 in Pont-Trambouze) was a member of the National Assembly of France. He represented Rhône's 8th constituency,  as a member of the Republicans.

He was elected Mayor of in 2020 and resigned as Member of Parliament due to the dual mandate. He was replaced in parliament by his substitute Nathalie Serre.

References

1973 births
Living people
People from Rhône (department)
Union for a Popular Movement politicians
The Republicans (France) politicians
The Popular Right
Deputies of the 13th National Assembly of the French Fifth Republic
Deputies of the 14th National Assembly of the French Fifth Republic
Deputies of the 15th National Assembly of the French Fifth Republic
Regional councillors of Auvergne-Rhône-Alpes
Members of Parliament for Rhône